Hylaeaicum pendulum is a species of flowering plant in the family Bromeliaceae, native to Ecuador and northern Peru. It was first described by Lyman Bradford Smith in 1963 as Neoregelia pendula.

References

BSI Cultivar Registry Retrieved 11 October 2009

Bromelioideae
Flora of Ecuador
Flora of Peru